In Morocco, The National Control Commission for the Protection of Personal Data (CNDP) was established by Law No. 09-08 Act of February 18, 2009, on the protection of individuals with regard to the processing of personal data. Its mandate is to ensure that the processing of personal data is lawful, legal, and does not violate privacy, fundamental freedoms, and human rights.

The commission should ideally consist of individuals chosen for their impartiality, moral probity, and competence in the legal, judicial, and IT areas.

Composition 
The commission is composed of a president as well as six commissioners appointed by the King of Morocco following a proposal by:
 the Prime Minister (two members);
 the President of the House of Representatives (two members); 
 the President of the House of Councilors (two members).

The members of the committee are appointed for a period of five years, renewable once.

List of current Commissioners since August 31, 2010 
President: Said Ihrai

Commissioners:
Mr. Omar Seghrouchni
Ms. Souad El Kohen
Mr. Idriss Belmahi
Mr. Abdelaziz Benzakour
Mr. Ibrahim Bouabid
Mr. Abdelmajid Ghamija

See also
 Privacy

Law of Morocco
2009 establishments in Morocco